The 2006 Commonwealth Bank Tennis Classic was a women's tennis tournament played on outdoor hard courts. It was the 12th edition of the Commonwealth Bank Tennis Classic, and was part of the Tier III Series of the 2006 WTA Tour. It took place at the Grand Hyatt Bali in Bali, Indonesia, from 11 through 17 September 2007.

Points and prize money

Point distribution

Prize money

* per team

Singles main-draw entrants

Seeds

1 Rankings as of 28 August 2006.

Other entrants

The following players received wildcards into the singles main draw:
  Kim So-jung
  María Vento-Kabchi
  Angelique Widjaja

The following players received entry from the qualifying draw:
  Ayu Fani Damayanti
  Sandy Gumulya
  Andreja Klepač
  Trudi Musgrave

The following players received entry as lucky losers:
  Vivien Silfany
  Lavinia Tananta

Withdrawals
  Maria Elena Camerin (left leg injury)
  Selima Sfar (left leg injury)

Doubles main-draw entrants

Seeds

1 Rankings as of 28 August 2006.

Champions

Singles

  Svetlana Kuznetsova defeated  Marion Bartoli, 7–5, 6–2
It was the 2nd title of the season for Kuznetsova and the 7th title in her singles career.

Doubles

  Lindsay Davenport /  Corina Morariu defeated  Natalie Grandin /  Trudi Musgrave, 6–3, 6–4
It was the 36th title for Davenport and the 13th title for Morariu in their respective doubles careers.

References

External links
 Official Results Archive (ITF)
 Official Results Archive (WTA)

Wismilak International
Commonwealth Bank Tennis Classic
2006 in Indonesian tennis